James Morton  is an Australian medical doctor and advocate for children with autism spectrum disorders. Morton is a specialist haematologist and oncologist at Brisbane's Mater Hospital and a senior specialist with the Leukaemia & Bone Marrow Transplant Service at the Royal Brisbane and Women's Hospital.

Biography 
Morton graduated with a MBSS from the University of Queensland in 1987 and completed his general medical training in 1991. In 1996, Morton travelled to the United States where he was an international fellow at the Fred Hutchinson Cancer Research Center in Seattle, before returning to Australian in 1998.

Morton was previously board member of Icon Cancer Care and the Leukaemia Foundation, where he was credited with developing the World's Greatest Shave initiative into an annual national campaign from a one-off event in Lismore, New South Wales.

Morton is arguably best known for his advocacy of children with autism.  After his two-year-old son was diagnosed with autism in 2002, Morton worked with other parents to establish a foundation to support autistic children and their families with evidence-based early intervention. The Autism and Early Intervention Outcomes Unit (AEIOU) Foundation for Children with Autism was founded in 2005. Initially opening just one special early childhood centre in Moorooka, the foundation now operates nine centres across Queensland and South Australia, employing 125 full-time staff and hosting about 300 autistic children.

In 2007, Morton commissioned a report which found the treatment of autism and similar conditions was costing the Australian economy up to $7 billion each year.   Following the report, Australian Prime Minister John Howard announced that $190 million of additional funding would be delivered to support services for autistic children.   The funding announcement was welcomed by Morton who described it as a "monumental package".

Morton was named in the 2015 Australia Day Honours and was made a Member of the Order of Australia in recognition for his significant service to children with autism spectrum disorders and to the field of oncology.

On Queensland Day in 2020, Morton was named as a Queensland Great.

References 

Year of birth missing (living people)
Living people
University of Queensland alumni
Australian haematologists
Queensland Greats
Members of the Order of Australia
Autism activists
People educated at Brisbane State High School
Australian oncologists